22nd Century Lifestyle is the debut album by American nu metal band pre)Thing. It was released on April 6, 2004, by V2 Records. This is the only pre)Thing album due to the death of the band's lead singer and guitarist, Rust Epique.

The album's only single, "Faded Love," managed to chart at No .38 on the US Mainstream Rock Tracks. "Can't Stop (22nd Century Lifestyle)" was also featured prominently in the video games: WWE Day of Reckoning, WWE SmackDown! vs. RAW, and WWE WrestleMania 21.

Track listing

Personnel 

 Rust Epique – vocals, guitar
 Bob Vaughan – bass
 Ted Barakat – drums
 Ayo Adeyemi – percussion
 Biff Wilson – background vocals
 Brian Virtue – producer
 Will Blochinger – photographer

Charts 
Singles – Billboard (North America)

References 

2004 debut albums
V2 Records albums
Pre)thing albums
Albums published posthumously